The 1994 Georgia Tech Yellow Jackets baseball team represented the Georgia Institute of Technology in the 1994 NCAA Division I baseball season. The Yellow Jackets played their home games at Russ Chandler Stadium. The team was coached by Danny Hall in his 1st season at Georgia Tech.

The Yellow Jackets lost the College World Series, defeated by the Oklahoma Sooners in the championship game.

Roster

Schedule 

! style="" | Regular Season
|- valign="top" 

|- align="center" bgcolor="#ccffcc" 
| February 11 ||  || Russ Chandler Stadium • Atlanta, GA || 3–1 || 1–0 || –
|- align="center" bgcolor="#ccffcc"
| February 12 || Minnesota || Russ Chandler Stadium • Atlanta, GA || 10–5 || 2–0 || –
|- align="center" bgcolor="#ccffcc"
| February 13 || Minnesota || Russ Chandler Stadium • Atlanta, GA || 8–2 || 3–0 || –
|- align="center" bgcolor="#ccffcc"
| February 19 || at  || Unknown • Statesboro, GA || 6–3 || 4–0 || –
|- align="center" bgcolor="#ccffcc"
| February 20 || at Georgia Southern || Unknown • Statesboro, GA || 15–2 || 5–0 || –
|- align="center" bgcolor="#ffcccc"
| February 25 || vs Oklahoma || Titan Field • Fullerton, CA || 6–8 || 5–1 || –
|- align="center" bgcolor="#ccffcc"
| February 26 || vs  || Titan Field • Fullerton, CA || 5–4 || 6–1 || –
|- align="center" bgcolor="#ffcccc"
| February 27 || at  || Titan Field • Fullerton, CA || 0–2 || 6–2 || –
|-

|- align="center" bgcolor="#ffcccc" 
| March 5 ||  || Russ Chandler Stadium • Atlanta, GA || 1–2 || 6–3 || –
|- align="center" bgcolor="#ccffcc" 
| March 5 || Rutgers || Russ Chandler Stadium • Atlanta, GA || 17–7 || 7–3 || –
|- align="center" bgcolor="#ccffcc" 
| March 6 || Rutgers || Russ Chandler Stadium • Atlanta, GA || 13–2 || 8–3 || –
|- align="center" bgcolor="#ccffcc" 
| March 8 ||  || Russ Chandler Stadium • Atlanta, GA || 22–4 || 9–3 || –
|- align="center" bgcolor="#ccffcc" 
| March 9 || Appalachian State || Russ Chandler Stadium • Atlanta, GA || 22–4 || 10–3 || –
|- align="center" bgcolor="#ccffcc" 
| March 11 ||  || Russ Chandler Stadium • Atlanta, GA || 4–1 || 11–3 || 1–0
|- align="center" bgcolor="#ccffcc" 
| March 12 || Virginia || Russ Chandler Stadium • Atlanta, GA || 6–2 || 12–3 || 2–0
|- align="center" bgcolor="#ccffcc" 
| March 13 || Virginia || Russ Chandler Stadium • Atlanta, GA || 7–6 || 13–3 || 3–0
|- align="center" bgcolor="#ccffcc" 
| March 19 ||  || Russ Chandler Stadium • Atlanta, GA || 26–1 || 14–3 || 3–0
|- align="center" bgcolor="#ccffcc" 
| March 20 || Siena || Russ Chandler Stadium • Atlanta, GA || 11–1 || 15–3 || 3–0
|- align="center" bgcolor="#ccffcc" 
| March 22 || at  || Shipley Field • College Park, MD || 12–4 || 16–3 || 4–0
|- align="center" bgcolor="#ffcccc" 
| March 23 || at Maryland || Shipley Field • College Park, MD || 5–6 || 16–4 || 4–1
|- align="center" bgcolor="#ccffcc" 
| March 24 || at Maryland || Shipley Field • College Park, MD || 12–4 || 17–4 || 5–1
|- align="center" bgcolor="#ccffcc" 
| March 25 ||  || Russ Chandler Stadium • Atlanta, GA || 6–4 || 18–4 || 5–1
|- align="center" bgcolor="#ccffcc" 
| March 26 || Ohio || Russ Chandler Stadium • Atlanta, GA || 12–5 || 19–4 || 5–1
|- align="center" bgcolor="#ccffcc" 
| March 29 ||  || Russ Chandler Stadium • Atlanta, GA || 12–2 || 20–4 || 5–1
|- align="center" bgcolor="#ccffcc" 
| March 30 || Winthrop || Russ Chandler Stadium • Atlanta, GA || 17–8 || 21–4 || 5–1
|-

|- align="center" bgcolor="#ccffcc" 
| April 1 ||  || Russ Chandler Stadium • Atlanta, GA || 7–4 || 22–4 || 6–1
|- align="center" bgcolor="#ccffcc" 
| April 2 || North Carolina || Russ Chandler Stadium • Atlanta, GA || 7–6 || 23–4 || 7–1
|- align="center" bgcolor="#ffcccc" 
| April 3 || North Carolina || Russ Chandler Stadium • Atlanta, GA || 8–11 || 23–5 || 7–2
|- align="center" bgcolor="#ccffcc" 
| April 5 ||  || Russ Chandler Stadium • Atlanta, GA || 4–3 || 24–5 || 7–2
|- align="center" bgcolor="#ccffcc" 
| April 8 ||  || Russ Chandler Stadium • Atlanta, GA || 7–5 || 25–5 || 8–2
|- align="center" bgcolor="#ccffcc" 
| April 9 || Duke || Russ Chandler Stadium • Atlanta, GA || 9–2 || 26–5 || 9–2
|- align="center" bgcolor="#ccffcc" 
| April 10 || Duke || Russ Chandler Stadium • Atlanta, GA || 17–10 || 27–5 || 10–2
|- align="center" bgcolor="#ccffcc" 
| April 12 || Georgia State || Russ Chandler Stadium • Atlanta, GA || 28–3 || 28–5 || 10–2
|- align="center" bgcolor="#ffcccc" 
| April 13 ||  || Russ Chandler Stadium • Atlanta, GA || 4–6 || 28–6 || 10–2
|- align="center" bgcolor="#ffcccc" 
| April 15 || at  || Doak Field • Raleigh, NC || 7–8 || 28–7 || 10–3
|- align="center" bgcolor="#ccffcc" 
| April 16 || at NC State || Doak Field • Raleigh, NC || 11–7 || 29–7 || 11–3
|- align="center" bgcolor="#ccffcc" 
| April 17 || at NC State || Doak Field • Raleigh, NC || 7–4 || 30–7 || 12–3
|- align="center" bgcolor="#ccffcc" 
| April 20 || at  || Foley Field • Athens, GA || 8–0 || 31–7 || 12–3
|- align="center" bgcolor="#ffcccc" 
| April 22 || at  || Ernie Shore Field • Winston-Salem, NC || 1–2 || 31–8 || 12–4
|- align="center" bgcolor="#ccffcc" 
| April 23 || at Wake Forest || Ernie Shore Field • Winston-Salem, NC || 7–5 || 32–8 || 13–4
|- align="center" bgcolor="#ffcccc" 
| April 24 || at Wake Forest || Ernie Shore Field • Winston-Salem, NC || 2–14 || 32–9 || 13–5
|- align="center" bgcolor="#ccffcc" 
| April 26 || Georgia || Russ Chandler Stadium • Atlanta, GA || 13–2 || 33–9 || 13–5
|- align="center" bgcolor="#ffcccc" 
| April 29 || at Florida State || Dick Howser Stadium • Tallahassee, FL || 4–6 || 33–10 || 13–6
|- align="center" bgcolor="#ccffcc" 
| April 30 || at Florida State || Dick Howser Stadium • Tallahassee, FL || 6–2 || 34–10 || 14–6
|-

|- align="center" bgcolor="#ccffcc" 
| May 1 || at Florida State || Dick Howser Stadium • Tallahassee, FL || 7–5 || 35–10 || 15–6
|- align="center" bgcolor="#ffcccc" 
| May 4 || at  || Claude Smith Field • Macon, GA || 5–6 || 35–11 || 15–6
|- align="center" bgcolor="#ccffcc" 
| May 6 || Georgia Southern || Russ Chandler Stadium • Atlanta, GA || 9–6 || 36–11 || 15–6
|- align="center" bgcolor="#ccffcc" 
| May 7 || Georgia Southern || Russ Chandler Stadium • Atlanta, GA || 8–6 || 37–11 || 15–6
|- align="center" bgcolor="#ccffcc" 
| May 8 || Georgia Southern || Russ Chandler Stadium • Atlanta, GA || 15–6 || 38–11 || 15–6
|- align="center" bgcolor="#ccffcc" 
| May 10 || Georgia || Russ Chandler Stadium • Atlanta, GA || 14–1 || 39–11 || 15–6
|- align="center" bgcolor="#ccffcc" 
| May 11 || at Georgia State || Georgia State Baseball Complex • Decatur, GA || 23–9 || 40–11 || 15–6
|- align="center" bgcolor="#ffcccc" 
| May 13 || Clemson || Russ Chandler Stadium • Atlanta, GA || 8–9 || 40–12 || 15–7
|- align="center" bgcolor="#ccffcc" 
| May 14 || Clemson || Russ Chandler Stadium • Atlanta, GA || 20–4 || 41–12 || 16–7
|- align="center" bgcolor="#ffcccc" 
| May 15 || Clemson || Russ Chandler Stadium • Atlanta, GA || 4–7 || 41–13 || 16–8
|-

|-
! style="" | Postseason
|-

|- align="center" bgcolor="#ccffcc" 
| May 18 || vs North Carolina || Greenville Municipal Stadium • Greenville, SC || 7–4 || 42–13 || 16–8
|- align="center" bgcolor="#ccffcc" 
| May 19 || vs Wake Forest || Greenville Municipal Stadium • Greenville, SC || 6–0 || 43–13 || 16–8
|- align="center" bgcolor="#ffcccc" 
| May 20 || vs Clemson || Greenville Municipal Stadium • Greenville, SC || 6–9 || 43–14 || 16–8
|- align="center" bgcolor="#ffcccc" 
| May 21 || vs NC State || Greenville Municipal Stadium • Greenville, SC || 2–11 || 43–15 || 16–8
|-

|- align="center" bgcolor="#ccffcc" 
| May 27 || vs Connecticut || Eck Stadium • Wichita, KS || 7–0 || 44–15 || 16–8
|- align="center" bgcolor="#ccffcc" 
| May 28 || at  || Eck Stadium • Wichita, KS || 13–1 || 45–15 || 16–8
|- align="center" bgcolor="#ccffcc" 
| May 29 || vs  || Eck Stadium • Wichita, KS || 6–2 || 46–15 || 16–8
|- align="center" bgcolor="#ffcccc" 
| May 30 || vs Washington || Eck Stadium • Wichita, KS || 9–12 || 46–16 || 16–8
|- align="center" bgcolor="#ccffcc" 
| May 30 || vs Washington || Eck Stadium • Wichita, KS || 18712 || 47–16 || 16–8
|-

|- align="center" bgcolor="#ccffcc" 
| June 3 || vs Cal State Fullerton || Johnny Rosenblatt Stadium • Omaha, NE || 2–0 || 48–16 || 16–8
|- align="center" bgcolor="#ccffcc" 
| June 5 || vs Florida State || Johnny Rosenblatt Stadium • Omaha, NE || 12–4 || 49–16 || 16–8
|- align="center" bgcolor="#ccffcc" 
| June 8 || Cal State Fullerton || Johnny Rosenblatt Stadium • Omaha, NE || 3–2 || 50–16 || 16–8
|- align="center" bgcolor="#ffcccc" 
| June 11 || vs  Oklahoma || Johnny Rosenblatt Stadium • Omaha, NE || 5–13 || 50–17 || 16–8
|-

Awards and honors 
Nomar Garciaparra
 First Team All-Atlantic Coast Conference
 All-Tournament Team

Jason Varitek
 First Team All-Atlantic Coast Conference
 All-Tournament Team

Brad Rigby
 First Team All-Atlantic Coast Conference
 All-Tournament Team

Yellow Jackets in the 1994 MLB Draft 
The following members of the Georgia Tech Yellow Jackets baseball program were drafted in the 1994 Major League Baseball Draft.

References 

Georgia Tech Yellow Jackets baseball seasons
College World Series seasons
Georgia Tech Yellow Jackets
Georgia Tech
Georgia Tech